Ángel René Quitral Encina (15 September 1924 – 26 November 1982) was a Chilean football goalkeeper who was part of the national soccer team Chile in the 1950 FIFA World Cup. He also played for Bádminton (1947–1948), Santiago Wanderers (1949–1954) and San Luis de Quillota (1955–1958). He also participated in 1958 FIFA World Cup Sweden Eliminatory process.
He had two titles in his career: 1955 and 1958, second division Championship with San Luis de Quillota, being one of the biggest references until this time for this Club.

Personal life
Quitral was of Mapuche descent.

Quitral died on 26 November 1982, at the age of 62.

References

External links
FIFA profile
René Quitral at PartidosdeLaRoja.com 

1924 births
1982 deaths
Chilean people of Mapuche descent
Footballers from Santiago
Chilean footballers
Chile international footballers
Badminton F.C. footballers
Santiago Wanderers footballers
San Luis de Quillota footballers
Chilean Primera División players
Primera B de Chile players
Association football goalkeepers
1950 FIFA World Cup players
Mapuche sportspeople
Indigenous sportspeople of the Americas